William Borders may refer to:
 William Holmes Borders (1905–1993), Atlanta minister and civil rights activist
 William Donald Borders (1913–2010), American prelate of the Roman Catholic Church, 13th Archbishop of Baltimore 1974–1989
 Bill Borders (born 1930), American Olympic wrestler